Zubed Ali is a Bangladesh Awami League politician and the former Member of Parliament of Former Mymensingh-24, Netrokona-4 and Netrokona-3.

Career
Ali  was elected to parliament from Mymensingh-24 as a Bangladesh Awami League candidate in 1973. He was elected to parliament from Netrokona-4 as a Bangladesh Awami League candidate in 1986. He was elected to parliament from Netrokona-3 as a Bangladesh Awami League candidate in 1991. He lost the June 1996 and 2001 elections.

References

Awami League politicians
Living people
5th Jatiya Sangsad members
Year of birth missing (living people)
3rd Jatiya Sangsad members
1st Jatiya Sangsad members